The men's three event competition in water skiing at the 2009 World Games took place from 22 to 25 July 2009 at the Lotus Lake in Kaohsiung, Taiwan.

Competition format
A total of 12 athletes (two of them competed only in preliminaries of slalom) entered the competition. In this competition athletes compete in three events: slalom, tricks and jump. Best 10 athletes from preliminary round qualifies to the final.

Results

Preliminary

Final

References

External links
 Results on IWGA website

Water skiing at the 2009 World Games